Quercus hartwissiana, the Strandzha oak, is a species of oak, native to southeastern Bulgaria, northern Asia Minor along the Black Sea, and the Caucasus. It was described by the Finnish-born Russian botanist and entomologist Christian von Steven in 1857.

Description
The bark is thick, finely furrowed, almost black. The shoots are dark reddish-brown and bald. The leaf veins are all directed into the lobes of the leaf, not into the indentations between them. The top of the leaf is bright green, the underside is dull, with a dark brown shading, with fine fleece and somewhat longer reddish hairs along the leaf veins, or in the angles between them.

On a petiole with a length of 2 to 7 cm, there are one to four acorns. Their fruits mature in the first year. The acorns are 2.5 to 3 cm long and 1.2 to 1.5 cm wide, the fruit cups measure 1.5 cm in length and 2 cm in diameter. The scales of the fruit cup are almost full to the top.

Epithet
The specific epithet hartwissiana is in honour of Russian botanist Nicolai Anders von Hartwiss.

Distribution

Quercus hartwissiana is found in the Euxine–Colchic deciduous forests ecoregion, in the temperate broadleaf and mixed forests biome along the Black Sea from the south-easternmost parts of the Balkan Peninsula along northern Asia Minor to western Caucasus. It grows in Bulgaria, Turkey, Georgia and Russia. In Bulgaria Quercus hartwissiana grows in Strandzha Nature Park and is distributed in the dense forest ecotype and the karst or xelophilous ecotype. In Strandzha it grows near river valleys, especially those of Veleka and Rezovo. There it is mixed with Carpinus betulus, Fagus orientalis, Sorbus torminalis, Quercus pubescens, Quercus cerris, Quercus frainetto, Carpinus orientalis and the shrubs Cistus creticus and Daphne pontica.

In Russia it occurs in the basin of the Mzymta River and in the North Caucasus. In Georgia it is known from Abkhazia, Racha-Lechkhumi and Kvemo Svaneti, Samegrelo, Imereti, Guria and Adjara; in eastern Georgia it is now known only from Kakheti.

It always occurs in mixed forests along with other tree species. It is a pre-glacial relict and is considered to be the ancestor of Quercus robur and Quercus petraea.

Fossil record
Fossils of Quercus hartwissiana have been described from the fossil flora of Kızılcahamam district in Turkey, which is of early Pliocene age.

See also

 List of Quercus species
 Euxine-Colchic deciduous forests
 Strandzha Nature Park

Citations

References

External links

 

hartwissiana
Flora of Bulgaria
Flora of Georgia (country)
Plants described in 1857
Trees of Europe
Trees of Turkey